Liverpool is a city and metropolitan borough in North West England. With a population of 486,100 in 2021, it is located within the county of Merseyside and is the principal city of the wider Liverpool City Region. Its metropolitan area is the fifth largest in the United Kingdom, with a population of 2.24 million.

On the eastern side of the Mersey Estuary, Liverpool historically lay within the ancient hundred of West Derby in the county of Lancashire. It became a borough in 1207, a city in 1880, and a county borough independent of the newly-created Lancashire County Council in 1889. Its growth as a major port was paralleled by the expansion of the city throughout the Industrial Revolution. Along with general cargo, freight, and raw materials such as coal and cotton, merchants were involved in the slave trade. In the 19th century, Liverpool was a major port of departure for English and Irish emigrants to North America.

In 2019, Liverpool was the fifth most visited UK city. It is noted for its culture, architecture, and transport links. The city is closely associated with the arts, especially music. The popularity of the Beatles, widely regarded as the most influential band of all time, led to it becoming a tourist destination. Liverpool has continued to be the home of numerous notable musicians and record  from the city have released 56 No. 1 hit singles, more than any other city in the world. The city also has a long-standing reputation for producing countless actors and actresses, artists, athletes, comedians, journalists, novelists, and poets.

Liverpool has the second highest number of art galleries, national museums, listed buildings, and listed parks in the UK; only the capital, London, has more. The former Liverpool Maritime Mercantile City includes the Pier Head, Albert Dock and William Brown Street. In sport, the city is best known as the home of Premier League football teams Liverpool FC and Everton FC, with matches between the two rivals being known as the Merseyside derby. The annual Grand National horse race takes place at Aintree Racecourse.

Several areas of Liverpool city centre carried World Heritage Site status from 2004 until 2021; the city's vast collection of parks and open spaces has been described as the "most important in the country" by England's Register of Historic Parks and Gardens of Special Historic Interest. Its status as a port city historically attracted a diverse population from a wide range of cultures, primarily Ireland, Norway, and Wales. It is also home to the oldest black community in the UK and the oldest Chinese community in Europe.

Natives of Liverpool (and some longtime residents from elsewhere) are formally referred to as "Liverpudlians" but are usually called "Scousers" in reference to scouse, a local stew made popular by sailors in the city; "Scouse" is also the most common name for the Liverpool accent and dialect. The city celebrated its 800th anniversary in 2007 and was named the 2008 European Capital of Culture, which it shared with the Norwegian city of Stavanger. Its selection as a European Capital of Culture has been credited with kickstarting its economic renaissance.

Toponymy
The name comes from the Old English lifer, meaning thick or muddy water, and pōl, meaning a pool or creek, and is first recorded around 1190 as Liuerpul. According to the Cambridge Dictionary of English Place-Names, "The original reference was to a pool or tidal creek now filled up into which two streams drained". The place appearing as Leyrpole, in a legal record of 1418, may also refer to Liverpool. Other origins of the name have been suggested, including "elverpool", a reference to the large number of eels in the Mersey. The adjective "Liverpudlian" was first recorded in 1833.

Although the Old English origin of the name Liverpool is beyond dispute, claims are sometimes made that the name Liverpool is of Welsh origin, but these are without foundation. The Welsh name for Liverpool is Lerpwl, from a former English local form Leerpool. This is a reduction of the form "Leverpool" with the loss of the intervocalic [v] (seen in other English names and words e.g. Daventry (Northamptonshire) > Danetry, never-do-well > ne’er-do-well).

In the 19th century, some Welsh publications used the name "Lle'r Pwll" ("(the) place (of) the pool"), a reinterpretation of Lerpwl, probably in the belief that "Lle'r Pwll" was the original form.

Another name, which is widely known even today, is Llynlleifiad, again a 19th-century coining. "Llyn" is pool, but "lleifiad" has no obvious meaning. G. Melville Richards (1910–1973), a pioneer of scientific toponymy in Wales, in "Place Names of North Wales", does not attempt to explain it beyond noting that "lleifiad" is used as a Welsh equivalent of "Liver".

A derivative form of a learned borrowing into Welsh (*llaf) of Latin lāma (slough, bog, fen) to give "lleifiad" is possible, but unproven.

History

Early history
King John's letters patent of 1207 announced the foundation of the borough of Liverpool. By the middle of the 16th century, the population was still around 500. The original street plan of Liverpool is said to have been designed by King John near the same time it was granted a royal charter, making it a borough. The original seven streets were laid out in an H shape: Bank Street (now Water Street), Castle Street, Chapel Street, Dale Street, Juggler Street (now High Street), Moor Street (now Tithebarn Street) and Whiteacre Street (now Old Hall Street).

In the 17th century there was slow progress in trade and population growth. Battles for control of the town were waged during the English Civil War, including a brief siege in 1644. In 1699, the same year as its first recorded slave ship, Liverpool Merchant, set sail for Africa, Liverpool was made a parish by Act of Parliament. But arguably the legislation of 1695 that reformed the Liverpool council was of more significance to its subsequent development. Since Roman times, the nearby city of Chester on the River Dee had been the region's principal port on the Irish Sea. However, as the Dee began to silt up, maritime trade from Chester became increasingly difficult and shifted towards Liverpool on the neighbouring River Mersey.

As trade from the West Indies, including sugar, surpassed that of Ireland and Europe, and as the River Dee continued to silt up, Liverpool began to grow with increasing rapidity. The first commercial wet dock was built in Liverpool in 1715. Substantial profits from the slave trade and tobacco helped the town to prosper and rapidly grow, although several prominent local men, including William Rathbone, William Roscoe and Edward Rushton, were at the forefront of the local abolitionist movement.

19th century
By the start of the 19th century, a large volume of trade was passing through Liverpool, and the construction of major buildings reflected this wealth. In 1830, Liverpool and Manchester became the first cities to have an intercity rail link, through the Liverpool and Manchester Railway. The population continued to rise rapidly, especially during the 1840s when Irish migrants began arriving by the hundreds of thousands as a result of the Great Famine.

In her poetical illustration "Liverpool" (1832), which celebrates the city's worldwide commerce, Letitia Elizabeth Landon refers specifically to the Macgregor Laird expedition to the Niger River, at that time in progress. This is to a painting by Samuel Austin, Liverpool, from the Mersey.

Britain was a major market for cotton imported from the Deep South of the United States, which fed the textile industry in the country. Given the crucial place cotton held in the city's economy, during the American Civil War Liverpool was, in the words of historian Sven Beckert, "the most pro-Confederate place in the world outside the Confederacy itself."

For periods during the 19th century, the wealth of Liverpool exceeded that of London, and Liverpool's Custom House was the single largest contributor to the British Exchequer. Liverpool was the only British city ever to have its own Whitehall office.

In the early 19th century, Liverpool played a major role in the Antarctic sealing industry, in recognition of which Liverpool Beach in the South Shetland Islands is named after the city.

As early as 1851 the city was described as "the New York of Europe". During the late 19th and early 20th centuries, Liverpool was attracting immigrants from across Europe. This resulted in the construction of a diverse array of religious buildings in the city for the new ethnic and religious groups, many of which are still in use today. The Deutsche Kirche Liverpool, Greek Orthodox Church of St Nicholas, Gustav Adolf Church and Princes Road Synagogue were all established in the 1800s to serve Liverpool's growing German, Greek, Nordic and Jewish communities, respectively. One of Liverpool's oldest surviving churches, St. Peter's Roman Catholic Church, served the Polish community in its final years as a place of worship.

20th century
The postwar period after the Great War was marked by social unrest, as society grappled with the massive war losses of young men, as well as trying to integrate veterans into the economy. Union organising and strikes took place in numerous locations, including police strikes in London among the Metropolitan Police. Numerous colonial soldiers and sailors from Africa and India, who had served with the UK, settled in Liverpool and other port cities. In June 1919 they were subject to attack by whites in racial riots; residents in the port included Swedish immigrants, and both groups had to compete with native people from Liverpool for jobs and housing. In this period, race riots also took place in Cardiff, Newport and Barry, and there had been incidents in Glasgow, South Shields, London, Hull and Salford.

The Housing Act 1919 resulted in mass council housing being built across Liverpool during the 1920s and 1930s. Thousands of families were relocated from the inner-city to new suburban housing estates, based on the belief that this would improve their standard of living, though this is largely subjective. Numerous private homes were also built during this era. During the Great Depression of the early 1930s, unemployment peaked at around 30% in the city.

Liverpool was the site of Britain's first provincial airport, operating from 1930. During the Second World War, the critical strategic importance of Liverpool was recognised by both Hitler and Churchill. The city was heavily bombed by the Germans, suffering a blitz second only to London's. The pivotal Battle of the Atlantic was planned, fought and won from Liverpool.

The Luftwaffe made 80 air raids on Merseyside, killing 2,500 people and causing damage to almost half the homes in the metropolitan area. Significant rebuilding followed the war, including massive housing estates and the Seaforth Dock, the largest dock project in Britain. Much of the immediate reconstruction of the city centre has been deeply unpopular. It was as flawed as much subsequent town planning renewal in the 1950s and 1960s. The historic portions of the city that had survived German bombing suffered extensive destruction during urban renewal. Since 1952 Liverpool has been twinned with Cologne, Germany, a city which also suffered severe aerial bombing during the war.

A significant West Indian black community has existed in the city since the first two decades of the 20th century. Like most British cities and industrialised towns, Liverpool became home to a significant number of Commonwealth immigrants, beginning after World War I with colonial soldiers and sailors who had served in the area.  More immigrants arrived after World War II, mostly settling in older inner-city areas such as Toxteth, where housing was less expensive. The black population of Liverpool was recorded at 1.90% in 2011.

The construction of suburban public housing expanded after the Second World War. Some of the older inner-city areas were redeveloped for new homes.

In the 1960s Liverpool was the centre of the "Merseybeat" sound, which became synonymous with the Beatles and fellow Liverpudlian rock bands. Influenced by American rhythm and blues and rock music, they also in turn strongly affected American music for years and were internationally popular. The Beatles became internationally known in the early 1960s and performed for years together; they were the most commercially successful and musically influential band in popular history. Their co-founder, singer, and composer John Lennon was killed in New York City in 1980. Liverpool airport was renamed after him in 2002, the first British airport to be named in honour of an individual.

Previously part of Lancashire, and a county borough from 1889, Liverpool in 1974 became a metropolitan borough within the newly created metropolitan county of Merseyside.

From the mid-1970s onwards, Liverpool's docks and traditional manufacturing industries declined due to restructuring of shipping and heavy industry, causing massive losses of jobs. The advent of containerisation meant that the city's docks became largely obsolete, and dock workers were thrown out of jobs. By the early 1980s unemployment rates in Liverpool were among the highest in the UK, standing at 17% by January 1982. This was about half the level of unemployment that had affected the city during the Great Depression 50 years previously. During this period, Liverpool became a hub of fierce left-wing opposition to the central government in London.

In the later 20th century, Liverpool's economy began to recover. Since the mid-1990s the city has enjoyed growth rates higher than the national average.
 At the end of the 20th century, Liverpool was concentrating on regeneration, a process that continues today.

21st century
To celebrate the Golden Jubilee of Elizabeth II in 2002, the conservation charity Plantlife organised a competition to choose county flowers; the sea-holly was Liverpool's final choice.

Capitalising on the popularity of 1960s rock groups, such as the Beatles, as well as the city's world-class art galleries, museums and landmarks, tourism has also become a significant factor in Liverpool's economy.

In 2004, property developer Grosvenor started the Paradise Project, a £920 m development based on Paradise Street. This produced the most significant changes to Liverpool's city centre since the post-war reconstruction. Renamed 'Liverpool ONE,' the centre opened in May 2008.

In 2007, the city celebrated the 800th anniversary of the founding of the borough of Liverpool, for which a number of events were planned. Liverpool was designated as a joint European Capital of Culture for 2008. The main celebrations, in September 2008, included the erection of La Princesse, a large mechanical spider 20 metres high and weighing 37 tonnes, and represents the "eight legs" of Liverpool: honour, history, music, the Mersey, the ports, governance, sunshine and culture. La Princesse roamed the streets of the city during the festivities, and concluded by entering the Queensway Tunnel.

Spearheaded by the multi-billion-pound Liverpool ONE development, regeneration has continued through to the start of the early 2010s. Some of the most significant redevelopment projects include new buildings in the Commercial District, the King's Dock, Mann Island, the Lime Street Gateway, the Baltic Triangle, the RopeWalks, and the Edge Lane Gateway. All projects could be eclipsed by the Liverpool Waters scheme, which if built will cost in the region of £5.5billion and be one of the largest megaprojects in the UK's history. Liverpool Waters is a mixed-use development planned to contain one of Europe's largest skyscraper clusters. The project received outline planning permission in 2012, despite fierce opposition from such groups as UNESCO, which claimed that it would adversely affect Liverpool's World Heritage status.

In June 2014, Prime Minister David Cameron launched the International Festival for Business in Liverpool, the world's largest business event in 2014, and the largest in the UK since the Festival of Britain in 1951. In July 2021, Liverpool lost its World Heritage status, UNESCO citing the Bramley-Moore Dock Stadium and Liverpool Waters projects as not being in keeping with a World Heritage site.

Inventions and innovations

Liverpool has been a centre of invention and innovation. Railways, transatlantic steamships, municipal trams, and electric trains were all pioneered in Liverpool as modes of mass transit. In 1829 and 1836, the first railway tunnels in the world were constructed under Liverpool (Wapping Tunnel). From 1950 to 1951, the world's first scheduled passenger helicopter service ran between Liverpool and Cardiff.

The first School for the Blind, Mechanics' Institute, High School for Girls, council house, and Juvenile Court were all founded in Liverpool. Charities such as the RSPCA, NSPCC, Age Concern, Relate, and Citizen's Advice Bureau all evolved from work in the city.

The first lifeboat station, public bath and wash-house, sanitary act, medical officer for health (William Henry Duncan), district nurse, slum clearance, purpose-built ambulance, X-ray medical diagnosis, school of tropical medicine (Liverpool School of Tropical Medicine), motorised municipal fire-engine, free school meal, cancer research centre, and zoonosis research centre all originated in Liverpool. The first British Nobel Prize was awarded in 1902 to Ronald Ross, professor at the School of Tropical Medicine, the first school of its kind in the world. Orthopaedic surgery was pioneered in Liverpool by Hugh Owen Thomas, and modern medical anaesthetics by Thomas Cecil Gray.

The world's first integrated sewer system was constructed in Liverpool by James Newlands, appointed in 1847 as the UK's first borough engineer. Liverpool also founded the UK's first Underwriters' Association and the first Institute of Accountants. The Western world's first financial derivatives (cotton futures) were traded on the Liverpool Cotton Exchange in the late 1700s.

In the arts, Liverpool was home to the first lending library (The Lyceum), athenaeum society (Liverpool Athenaeum), arts centre (Bluecoat Chambers), and public art conservation centre (National Conservation Centre). It is also home to the UK's oldest surviving classical orchestra (Royal Liverpool Philharmonic Orchestra) and repertory theatre (Liverpool Playhouse).

In 1864, Peter Ellis built the world's first iron-framed, curtain-walled office building, Oriel Chambers, which was a prototype of the skyscraper. The UK's first purpose-built department store was Compton House, completed in 1867 for the retailer J.R. Jeffrey. It was the largest store in the world at the time.

Between 1862 and 1867, Liverpool held an annual Grand Olympic Festival. Devised by John Hulley and Charles Pierre Melly, these games were the first to be wholly amateur in nature and international in outlook. The programme of the first modern Olympiad in Athens in 1896 was almost identical to that of the Liverpool Olympics. In 1865, Hulley co-founded the National Olympian Association in Liverpool, a forerunner of the British Olympic Association. Its articles of foundation provided the framework for the International Olympic Charter.

Sir Alfred Lewis Jones, a shipowner, introduced bananas to the UK via Liverpool's docks in 1884. The Mersey Railway, opened in 1886, incorporated the world's first tunnel under a tidal estuary and the world's first deep-level underground stations (Liverpool James Street railway station).

In 1889, borough engineer John Alexander Brodie invented the football goal net. He also was a pioneer in the use of pre-fabricated housing and oversaw the construction of the UK's first ring road (A5058) and intercity highway (East Lancashire Road), as well as the Queensway Tunnel linking Liverpool and Birkenhead. Described as "the eighth wonder of the world" at the time of its construction, it was the longest underwater tunnel in the world for 24 years.

In 1897, the Lumière brothers filmed Liverpool, including what is believed to be the world's first tracking shot, taken from the Liverpool Overhead Railway, the world's first elevated electrified railway. The Overhead Railway was the first railway in the world to use electric multiple units, employ automatic signalling, and install an escalator.

Liverpool inventor Frank Hornby was a visionary in toy development and manufacture, producing three of the most popular lines of toys in the 20th century: Meccano, Hornby Model Railways, and Dinky Toys. The British Interplanetary Society, founded in Liverpool in 1933 by Phillip Ellaby Cleator, is the world's oldest existing organisation devoted to the promotion of spaceflight. Its journal, the Journal of the British Interplanetary Society, is the longest-running astronautical publication in the world.

In 1999, Liverpool was the first city outside London to be awarded blue plaques by English Heritage in recognition of the "significant contribution made by its sons and daughters in all walks of life".

Government

For the purposes of local government, the city of Liverpool is classified as a metropolitan borough. The metropolitan borough is located within both the county of Merseyside and the Liverpool City Region. Each of these geographical areas is treated as an administrative area with different levels of local governance applying to each.

Liverpool City Council is the governing body solely for the city of Liverpool and performs functions that are standard of an English Unitary Authority. 
The Liverpool City Region Combined Authority reserves major strategic powers over such things as transport, economic development and regeneration for the city along with the 5 surrounding boroughs of the Liverpool City Region. The Combined Authority has competency over areas which have been devolved by national government and are specific to the local area.

Nevertheless, there are a few exceptions to local governance apart from these two structures. Liverpool was administered by Merseyside County Council between 1974 and 1986 and some residual aspects of organisation which date back to this time have survived. When the County Council was disbanded in 1986, most civic functions were transferred to Liverpool City Council. However, several authorities such as the police and fire and rescue service, continue to be run at a county-wide level. The county of Merseyside, therefore, continues to exist as an administrative area for a few limited services only, while the capability and capacity of the Liverpool City Region Combined Authority is evolving over time.

The city also elects four members of Parliament (MPs) to the Westminster Parliament.

Three mayors

The City of Liverpool is governed by three separate mayors, each with their own distinct functions and powers.

Mayor of Liverpool

The mayor of Liverpool is directly elected by the public every four years to lead Liverpool City Council. The figure is responsible for directing the City Council's policies and appoints cabinet members to run key council functions such as education and housing. The council's 90 elected councillors who represent local communities throughout the city are responsible for scrutinising the mayor's decisions and setting the budget and policy framework of the city. The mayor's responsibility is to be a powerful voice for the city both nationally and internationally, to lead, build investor confidence, and to direct resources to economic priorities. The mayor also exchanges direct dialogue with government ministers and the Prime Minister through his seat at the Cabinet of Mayors. Discussions include pressing decision-makers in the government on local issues as well as building relationships with the other directly elected mayors in England and Wales. The current Mayor is Joanne Anderson.

Lord Mayor of Liverpool

This role is the oldest of the three mayors and is mostly ceremonial. The Lord Mayor is chosen only by councillors within Liverpool City Council, not the general public, and serves a one-year term. The Lord Mayor is styled as the 'first citizen' and chosen representative of the city. They represent the city at functions, promote it to the wider world and attend religious ceremonies. They also have the key task of chairing full council meetings and can choose a number of charities to support throughout their term.

Metro Mayor of Liverpool City Region

The City of Liverpool is one of the six constituent local government districts of the Liverpool City Region. The Metro Mayor of the Liverpool City Region is directly every four years by residents of those six boroughs and oversees the Liverpool City Region Combined Authority. The Combined Authority is the top-tier administrative body for the local governance of the city region and is tasked with taking major strategic decisions on issues such as transport and investment, economic development, employment and skills, tourism, culture, housing and physical infrastructure. The current Metro Mayor is Steve Rotheram.

City Council and MPs

Liverpool City Council elections

For local elections the city is split into 30 local council wards, which in alphabetical order are:

During the local elections held in May 2011, the Labour Party consolidated its control of Liverpool City Council, following on from regaining power for the first time in 12 years, during the previous elections in May 2010. The Labour Party gained 11 seats during the election, taking their total to 62 seats, compared with the 22 held by the Liberal Democrats. Of the remaining seats, the Liberal Party won three and the Green Party claimed two. The Conservative Party, one of the three major political parties in the UK had no representation on Liverpool City Council.

In February 2008, Liverpool City Council was reported to be the worst-performing council in the country, receiving just a one-star rating (classified as inadequate). The main cause of the poor rating was attributed to the council's poor handling of tax-payer money, including the accumulation of a £20m shortfall on Capital of Culture funding.

While Liverpool through most of the 19th and early 20th centuries was a municipal stronghold of Toryism, support for the Conservative Party recently has been among the lowest in any part of Britain, particularly since the monetarist economic policies of prime minister Margaret Thatcher after her 1979 general election victory contributed to high unemployment in the city which did not begin to fall for many years. Liverpool is one of the Labour Party's key strongholds; however the city has seen hard times under Labour governments as well, particularly in the Winter of Discontent (late 1978 and early 1979) when Liverpool suffered public sector strikes along with the rest of the United Kingdom but also suffered the particularly humiliating misfortune of having grave-diggers going on strike, leaving the dead unburied.

Parliamentary constituencies and MPs

Liverpool has four parliamentary constituencies entirely within the city, through which MPs are elected to represent the city in Westminster: Liverpool Riverside, Liverpool Walton, Liverpool Wavertree and Liverpool West Derby. At the last general election, all were won by Labour with representation being from Kim Johnson, Dan Carden, Paula Barker and Ian Byrne respectively. Due to boundary changes prior to the 2010 election, the Liverpool Garston constituency was merged with most of Knowsley South to form the Garston and Halewood cross-boundary seat. At the most 2019 election this seat was won by Maria Eagle of the Labour Party.

Geography

Environment 

Liverpool has been described as having "the most splendid setting of any English city."

The Mersey Estuary separates Liverpool from the Wirral Peninsula. The boundaries of Liverpool are adjacent to Bootle, Crosby and Maghull in south Sefton to the north, and Kirkby, Huyton, Prescot and Halewood in Knowsley to the east.

Climate

Liverpool experiences a temperate maritime climate (Köppen: Cfb), like much of the British Isles, with relatively mild summers, cool winters and rainfall spread fairly evenly throughout the year. Rainfall and Temperature records have been kept at Bidston since 1867, but records for atmospheric pressure go back as far as at least 1846. Bidston closed down in 2002 but the Met Office also has a weather station at Crosby.

The lowest amount of sunshine on record was 16.5 hours in December 1927 whereas the most was 314.5 hours in July 2013.

Tornado activity or funnel cloud formation is very rare in and around the Liverpool area and tornadoes that do form are usually weak. Recent tornadoes or funnel clouds in Merseyside have been seen in 1998 and 2014.

During the period 1981–2010, Crosby recorded an average of 32.8 days of air frost per year, which is low for the United Kingdom. Snow is fairly common during the winter although heavy snow is rare. Snow generally falls between November and March but can occasionally fall earlier and later. In recent times, the earliest snowfall was on 1 October 2008 while the latest occurred on 15 May 2012. Although historically, the earliest snowfall occurred on 10 September 1908 and the latest on 2 June 1975.

Human

Suburbs and districts

Suburbs and districts of Liverpool include:

Aigburth
Allerton
Anfield
Belle Vale
Broadgreen
Canning
Childwall
Chinatown
City Centre
Clubmoor
Croxteth
Dingle
Dovecot
Edge Hill
Everton
Fairfield
Fazakerley
Garston
Gateacre
Gillmoss
Grassendale
Hunt's Cross
Kensington
Kirkdale
Knotty Ash
Mossley Hill
Netherley
Norris Green
Oglet
Old Swan
Orrell Park
St Michael's Hamlet
Speke
Stoneycroft
Toxteth
Tuebrook
Vauxhall
Walton
Wavertree
West Derby
Woolton

Green Liverpool
In 2010 Liverpool City Council and the Primary Care Trust Commissioned The Mersey Forest to complete "A Green Infrastructure Strategy" for the city.

Green belt

Liverpool is a core urban element of a green belt region that extends into the wider surrounding counties, which is in place to reduce urban sprawl, prevent the towns in the conurbation from further convergence, protect the identity of outlying communities, encourage brownfield reuse, and preserve nearby countryside. This is achieved by restricting inappropriate development within the designated areas and imposing stricter conditions on permitted building.

Due to being already highly built up, the city contains limited portions of protected green belt area within greenfield throughout the borough, at Fazakerley, Croxteth Hall and country park and Craven Wood, Woodfields Park and nearby golf courses in Netherley, small greenfield tracts east of the Speke area by the St Ambrose primary school, and the small hamlet of Oglet and the surrounding area south of Liverpool Airport.

Demography

Population

The city
At the 2011 UK Census the recorded population of Liverpool was 466,415, a 6.1% increase on the figure of 439,473 recorded in the 2001 census. The population of the central Liverpool local authority peaked in the 1930s with 846,101 recorded in the 1931 census, before suburbanisation and the establishment of new towns in the region. As with many British cities including London and Manchester, the city centre covered by the Liverpool council area had experienced negative population growth since the 1931 census. Much of the population loss was as a result of large-scale resettlement programmes to nearby areas introduced in the aftermath of the Second World War, with satellite towns such as Kirkby, Skelmersdale and Runcorn seeing a corresponding rise in their populations (Kirkby being the fastest growing town in Britain during the 1960s).

, 66 per cent of the population was of working age.

As many as 75 percent (estimated) of Liverpool's population has Irish ancestry. The city therefore has claim of the British city with the strongest Irish heritage alongside Glasgow.

Urban and metropolitan area
Liverpool is the largest local authority by population, GDP and area in Merseyside. Liverpool is typically grouped with the wider Merseyside area for the purpose of defining its metropolitan footprint, and there are several methodologies. Liverpool is defined as a standalone NUTS3 area by the ONS for statistical purpose, and makes up part of the NUTS2 area "Merseyside" along with East Merseyside (Knowsley, St Helens and Halton), Sefton and the Wirral. The population of this area was 1,513,306 based on 2014 estimates.

The "Liverpool Urban Area" is a term used by the Office for National Statistics (ONS) to denote the urban area around the city to the east of the River Mersey. The contiguous built-up area extends beyond the area administered by Liverpool City Council into adjoining local authority areas, particularly parts of Sefton and Knowsley. As defined by ONS, the area extends as far east as Haydock and St. Helens. Unlike the Metropolitan area, the Urban Area does not include The Wirral or its contiguous areas. The population of this area as of 2011 was 864,211.

The "Liverpool City Region" is an economic partnership between local authorities in Merseyside under the umbrella of the Liverpool City Region Combined Authority as defined by the Mersey Partnership. The area covers Merseyside and the Borough of Halton and has an estimated population between 1,500,000 and 2,000,000 and.

In 2006 ESPON (now (European Observation Network for Territorial Development and Cohesion) released a study defining a "Liverpool/Birkenhead Metropolitan area" as a functional urban area consisting of contiguous urban areas, labour pool, and commuter "Travel To Work Areas". The analysis grouped the Merseyside metropolitan county with the borough of Halton, Wigan in Greater Manchester, the city of Chester as well as number of towns in Lancashire and Cheshire including Ormskirk and Warrington, estimating the polynuclear metropolitan area to have a population of 2,241,000 people.

Liverpool and Manchester are sometimes considered as one large polynuclear metropolitan area, or megalopolis.

Ethnicity

According to data from the 2011 census, 84.8 per cent of Liverpool's population was White British, 1.4 per cent White Irish, 2.6 per cent White Other, 4.1 per cent Asian or Asian British (including 1.1 per cent British Indian and 1.7 per cent British Chinese), 2.6 per cent Black or Black British (including 1.8 per cent Black African) and 2.5 per cent mixed-race. 1.8 per cent of respondents were from other ethnic groups.

According to a 2014 survey, the ten most popular surnames of Liverpool (with surname origin), followed with their population are: 
1. Jones (Welsh) – 23,012
2. Smith (English) – 16,276
3. Williams (Welsh) – 13,997
4. Davies (Welsh) – 10,149
5. Hughes (Welsh) – 9,787
6. Roberts (Welsh) – 9,571
7. Taylor (English) – 8,219
8. Johnson (English/Scottish) – 6,715
9. Brown (English/Scottish) – 6,603
10. Murphy (Irish) – 6,495

Liverpool is home to Britain's oldest Black community, dating to at least the 1730s. Some  Liverpudlians can trace their black ancestry in the city back ten generations. Early Black settlers in the city included seamen, the children of traders sent to be educated, and freed slaves, since slaves entering the country after 1722 were deemed free men. Since the 20th century, Liverpool is also noted for its large African-Caribbean, Ghanaian, and Somali communities, formed of more recent African-descended immigrants and their subsequent generations.

The city is also home to the oldest Chinese community in Europe; the first residents of the city's Chinatown arrived as seamen in the 19th century. The traditional Chinese gateway erected in Liverpool's Chinatown is the largest gateway outside China. Liverpool also has a long-standing Filipino community. Lita Roza, a singer from Liverpool who was the first woman to achieve a UK number one hit, had Filipino ancestry.

The city is also known for its large Irish and Welsh populations. In 1813, 10 per cent of Liverpool's population was Welsh, leading to the city becoming known as "the capital of North Wales."

During, and in the decades following, the Great Irish Famine in the mid-19th century, up to two million Irish people travelled to Liverpool within one decade, with many subsequently departing for the United States. By 1851, more than 20 per cent of the population of Liverpool was Irish. At the 2001 Census, 1.17 per cent of the population were Welsh-born and 0.75 per cent were born in the Republic of Ireland, while 0.54 per cent were born in Northern Ireland, but many more Liverpudlians are of legacy Welsh or Irish ancestry.

Other contemporary ethnicities include Indian, Latin American, Malaysian, and Yemeni communities, which number several thousand each.

Religion

The thousands of migrants and sailors passing through Liverpool resulted in a religious diversity that is still apparent today. This is reflected in the equally diverse collection of religious buildings, including two Christian cathedrals.

Liverpool is known to be England's 'most Catholic city', with a Catholic population much larger than in other parts of England. This is mainly due to high historic Irish migration to the city and their descendants since.

The parish church of Liverpool is the Anglican Our Lady and St Nicholas, colloquially known as "the sailors church", which has existed near the waterfront since 1257. It regularly plays host to Catholic masses. Other notable churches include the Greek Orthodox Church of St Nicholas (built in the Neo-Byzantine architecture style), and the Gustav Adolf Church (the Swedish Seamen's Church, reminiscent of Nordic styles).

Liverpool's wealth as a port city enabled the construction of two enormous cathedrals in the 20th century. The Anglican Cathedral, which was designed by Sir Giles Gilbert Scott and plays host to the annual Liverpool Shakespeare Festival, has one of the longest naves, largest organs and heaviest and highest peals of bells in the world. The Roman Catholic Metropolitan Cathedral, on Mount Pleasant next to Liverpool Science Park, was initially planned to be even larger. Of Sir Edwin Lutyens's original design, only the crypt was completed. The cathedral was eventually built to a simpler design by Sir Frederick Gibberd. While this is on a smaller scale than Lutyens' original design it still incorporates the largest panel of stained glass in the world. The road running between the two cathedrals is called Hope Street, a coincidence which pleases believers. The cathedral has traditionally colloquially been referred to as "Paddy's Wigwam" due to its shape.

Liverpool contains several synagogues, of which the Grade I listed Moorish Revival Princes Road Synagogue is architecturally the most notable. Princes Road is widely considered to be the most magnificent of Britain's Moorish Revival synagogues and one of the finest buildings in Liverpool. Liverpool has a thriving Jewish community with a further two orthodox Synagogues, one in the Allerton district of the city and a second in the Childwall district of the city where a significant Jewish community reside. A third orthodox Synagogue in the Greenbank Park area of L17 has recently closed and is a listed 1930s structure. There is also a Lubavitch Chabad House and a reform Synagogue. Liverpool has had a Jewish community since the mid-18th century. The Jewish population of Liverpool is around 5,000. The Liverpool Talmudical College existed from 1914 until 1990, when its classes moved to the Childwall Synagogue.

Liverpool also has a Hindu community, with a Mandir on Edge Lane, Edge Hill. The Shri Radha Krishna Temple from the Hindu Cultural Organisation in Liverpool is located there. Liverpool also has the Guru Nanak Sikh Gurdwara in Wavertree and a Baháʼí Centre in the same area.

The city had the earliest mosque in England, and possibly the UK, founded in 1887 by William Abdullah Quilliam, a lawyer who had converted to Islam, and set up the Liverpool Muslim Institute in a terraced house on West Derby Road. The building was used as a house of worship until 1908, when it was sold to the City Council and converted into offices. Plans have been accepted to re-convert the building where the mosque once stood into a museum. There are three mosques in Liverpool: the largest and main one, Al-Rahma mosque, in the Toxteth area of the city and a mosque recently opened in the Mossley Hill district of the city. The third mosque was also recently opened in Toxteth and is on Granby Street.

Demonymy and identity
Natives of the city of Liverpool are referred to as Liverpudlians, and colloquially as "Scousers", a reference to "scouse", a form of stew. The word "Scouse" has also become synonymous with the Liverpool accent and dialect. Many people "self-identify" as Liverpudlians or Scousers without actually being born or living within the city boundaries of Liverpool.

Economy

The economy of Liverpool is one of the largest within the United Kingdom, sitting at the centre of one of the two core economies within the North West of England. In 2006, the city's GVA was £7,626 million, providing a per capita figure of £17,489, which was above the North West average. Liverpool's economy has seen strong growth since the mid-1990s, with its GVA increasing 71.8% between 1995 and 2006 and employment increasing 12% between 1998 and 2006. GDP per capita was estimated to stand at $32,121 in 2014, and total GDP at $65.8 billion.

In common with much of the rest of the UK today, Liverpool's economy is dominated by service sector industries, both public and private. In 2007, over 60% of all employment in the city was in the public administration, education, health, banking, finance and insurance sectors. Over recent years there has also been significant growth in the knowledge economy of Liverpool with the establishment of the Liverpool Knowledge Quarter in sectors such as media and life sciences. Liverpool's rich architectural base has also helped the city become the second most filmed city in the UK outside London, including doubling for Chicago, London, Moscow, New York, Paris and Rome.

Another important component of Liverpool's economy are the tourism and leisure sectors. Liverpool is the sixth most visited UK city and one of the 100 most visited cities in the world by international tourists. In 2008, during the city's European Capital of Culture celebrations, overnight visitors brought £188m into the local economy, while tourism as a whole is worth approximately £1.3bn a year to Liverpool. The city's new cruise liner terminal, which is situated close to the Pier Head, also makes Liverpool one of the few places in the world where cruise ships are able to berth right in the centre of the city. Other recent developments in Liverpool such as the Echo Arena and Liverpool One have made Liverpool an important leisure centre with the latter helping to lift Liverpool into the top five retail destinations in the UK. 

Historically, the economy of Liverpool was centred on the city's port and manufacturing base, although a smaller proportion of total employment is today derived from the port. Nonetheless the city remains one of the most important ports in the United Kingdom, handling over 32.2m tonnes of cargo in 2008. A new multimillion-pound expansion to the Port of Liverpool, Liverpool2, is scheduled to be operational from the end of 2015, and is projected to greatly increase the volume of cargo which Liverpool is able to handle. Liverpool is also home to the UK headquarters of many shipping lines including Japanese firm NYK and Danish firm Maersk Line, whilst shipping firm Atlantic Container Line has recently invested significant amounts in expanding its Liverpool operations, with a new headquarters currently under construction. Future plans to redevelop the city's northern dock system, in a project known as Liverpool Waters, could see £5.5bn invested in the city over the next 50 years, creating 17,000 new jobs.

Car manufacturing also takes place in the city at the Jaguar Land Rover Halewood plant where the Range Rover Evoque model is assembled. In 2016 it was reported that The Beatles contribute £82 million a year to Liverpool's economy and help sustain 2,335 jobs.

Landmarks and recent development projects

Liverpool's history means that there are a considerable variety of architectural styles found within the city, ranging from 16th century Tudor buildings to modern-day contemporary architecture. The majority of buildings in the city date from the late-18th century onwards, the period during which the city grew into one of the foremost powers in the British Empire. There are over 2,500 listed buildings in Liverpool, of which 27 are Grade I listed and 85 are Grade II* listed. The city also has a greater number of public sculptures than any other location in the United Kingdom aside from Westminster and more Georgian houses than the city of Bath. This richness of architecture has subsequently seen Liverpool described by English Heritage, as England's finest Victorian city.

The value of Liverpool's architecture and design was recognised in 2004, when several areas throughout the city were declared a UNESCO World Heritage Site. Known as the Liverpool Maritime Mercantile City, the sites were added in recognition of the city's role in the development of international trade and docking technology. However this status was revoked in July 2021, when UNESCO resolved that recent and proposed developments, such as the Bramley-Moore Dock stadium and Liverpool Waters projects, had resulted in the "serious deterioration" of the area's significance.

Waterfront and docks

As a major British port, the docks in Liverpool have historically been central to the city's development. Several major docking firsts have occurred in the city including the construction of the world's first enclosed wet dock (the Old Dock) in 1715 and the first ever hydraulic lifting cranes. The best-known dock in Liverpool is the Royal Albert Dock, Liverpool, which was constructed in 1846 and today comprises the largest single collection of Grade I listed buildings anywhere in Britain. Built under the guidance of Jesse Hartley, it was considered to be one of the most advanced docks anywhere in the world upon completion and is often attributed with helping the city to become one of the most important ports in the world. The Albert Dock houses restaurants, bars, shops, two hotels as well as the Merseyside Maritime Museum, International Slavery Museum, Tate Liverpool and The Beatles Story. North of the city centre is Stanley Dock, home to the Stanley Dock Tobacco Warehouse, which was at the time of its construction in 1901, the world's largest building in terms of area and today stands as the world's largest brick-work building.

One of the most famous locations in Liverpool is the Pier Head, renowned for the trio of buildings – the Royal Liver Building, the Cunard Building and the Port of Liverpool Building – which sit upon it. Collectively referred to as the Three Graces, these buildings stand as a testament to the great wealth in the city during the late 19th and early 20th century. Built-in a variety of architectural styles, they are recognised as being the symbol of Maritime Liverpool and are regarded by many as contributing to one of the most impressive waterfronts in the world.

In recent years, several areas along Liverpool's waterfront have undergone significant redevelopment. Amongst the notable recent developments are the Museum of Liverpool, the construction of the Liverpool Arena and BT Convention Centre on Kings Dock, Alexandra Tower and 1 Princes Dock on Prince's Dock and Liverpool Marina around Coburg and Brunswick Docks. The Wheel of Liverpool opened on 25 March 2010.

However, plans to redevelop parts of the Liverpool have been marred by controversy. In December 2016, a newly formed company called North Point Global Ltd. was given the rights to develop part of the docks under the "New Chinatown" banner. Though heavily advertised in Liverpool, Hong Kong and Chinese cities with glossy advertisements and videos, the "New Chinatown" development failed to materialise. In January 2018, the Liverpool Echo and Asia Times revealed that the site remained sans any construction, North Point Global as well as its subcontractor "Bilt" had both declared bankruptcy, and the small investors (mostly middle class couples) who had already paid money for the apartments had lost most of their savings in them. Five similar development projects, mostly targeting individual Chinese and Hong Kong based citizens, were suspended due to financial misappropriations.

Commercial district and cultural quarter

Liverpool's historic position as one of the most important trading ports in the world has meant that over time many grand buildings have been constructed in the city as headquarters for shipping firms, insurance companies, banks and other large firms. The great wealth this brought, then allowed for the development of grand civic buildings, which were designed to allow the local administrators to 'run the city with pride'.

The commercial district is centred on the Castle Street, Dale Street and Old Hall Street areas of the city, with many of the area's roads still following their medieval layout. Having developed over a period of three centuries the area is regarded as one of the most important architectural locations in the city, as recognised by its inclusion in Liverpool's former World Heritage site.

The oldest building in the area is the Grade I listed Liverpool Town Hall, which is located at the top of Castle Street and dates from 1754. Often regarded as the city's finest piece of Georgian architecture, the building is known as one of the most extravagantly decorated civic buildings anywhere in Britain. Also on Castle Street is the Grade I listed Bank of England Building, constructed between 1845 and 1848, as one of only three provincial branches of the national bank. Amongst the other buildings in the area are the Tower Buildings, Albion House (the former White Star Line headquarters), the Municipal Buildings and Oriel Chambers, which is considered to be one of the earliest Modernist style buildings ever built.

The area around William Brown Street is referred to as the city's 'Cultural Quarter', owing to the presence of numerous civic buildings, including the William Brown Library, Walker Art Gallery, Picton Reading Rooms and World Museum Liverpool. The area is dominated by neo-classical architecture, of which the most prominent, St George's Hall, is widely regarded as the best example of a neo-classical building anywhere in Europe. A Grade I listed building, it was constructed between 1840 and 1855 to serve a variety of civic functions in the city and its doors are inscribed with "S.P.Q.L." (Latin senatus populusque Liverpudliensis), meaning "the senate and people of Liverpool". William Brown Street is also home to numerous public monuments and sculptures, including Wellington's Column and the Steble Fountain. Many others are located around the area, particularly in St John's Gardens, which was specifically developed for this purpose. The William Brown Street area has been likened to a modern recreation of the Roman Forum.

Other notable landmarks

While the majority of Liverpool's architecture dates from the mid-18th century onwards, there are several buildings that pre-date this time. One of the oldest surviving buildings is Speke Hall, a Tudor manor house located in the south of the city, which was completed in 1598. The building is one of the few remaining timber framed Tudor houses left in the north of England and is particularly noted for its Victorian interiors, which was added in the mid-19th century.

In addition to Speke Hall, many of the city's other oldest surviving buildings are also former manor houses including Croxteth Hall and Woolton Hall, which were completed in 1702 and 1704 respectively.
The oldest building within the city centre is the Grade I listed Bluecoat Chambers, which was built between 1717 and 1718. Constructed in British Queen Anne style, the building was influenced in part by the work of Christopher Wren and was originally the home of the Bluecoat School (who later moved to a larger site in Wavertree in the south of the city). Since 1908 it has acted as a centre for arts in Liverpool.

Liverpool is noted for having two Cathedrals, each of which imposes over the landscape around it. The Anglican Cathedral, which was constructed between 1904 and 1978, is the largest Cathedral in Britain and the fifth largest in the world. Designed and built in Gothic style, it is regarded as one of the greatest buildings to have been constructed during the 20th century and was described by former British Poet Laureate, John Betjeman, as 'one of the great buildings of the world'. The Roman Catholic Metropolitan Cathedral was constructed between 1962 and 1967 and is known as one of the first Cathedrals to break the traditional longitudinal design.

In recent years, many parts of Liverpool's city centre have undergone significant redevelopment and regeneration after years of decline. Around the north of the city centre several new skyscrapers have also been constructed including the RIBA award-winning Unity Buildings and West Tower, which at 140m is Liverpool's tallest building. Many redevelopment schemes are also in progress including Central Village / Circus, the Lime Street gateway, and the highly ambitious Liverpool Waters.

There are many other notable buildings in Liverpool, including the art deco former terminal building of Speke Airport, the University of Liverpool's Victoria Building, (which provided the inspiration for the term Red Brick University), and the Adelphi Hotel, which was in that past considered to be one of the finest hotels anywhere in the world.

Parks and gardens
The English Heritage National Register of Historic Parks describes Merseyside's Victorian Parks as collectively the "most important in the country". The city of Liverpool has ten listed parks and cemeteries, including two Grade I and five Grade II*, more than any other English city apart from London.

Transport

Transport in Liverpool is primarily centred on the city's road and rail networks, both of which are extensive and provide links across the United Kingdom. Liverpool has an extensive local public transport network, which is managed by Merseytravel, and includes buses, trains and ferries. Additionally, the city also has an international airport and a major port, both of which provides links to locations outside the country.

National and international travel

Roads
As a major city, Liverpool has direct road links with many other areas within England. To the east, the M62 motorway connects Liverpool with Hull and along the route provides links to several large cities, including Manchester, Leeds and Bradford. The M62 also provides a connection to both the M6 and M1 motorways, providing indirect links to more distant areas including Birmingham, London, Nottingham, Preston and Sheffield. To the west of the city, the Kingsway and Queensway Tunnels connect Liverpool with the Wirral Peninsula, including Birkenhead, and Wallasey. The A41 road and M53 motorway, which both begin in Birkenhead, link to Cheshire and Shropshire and via the A55, to North Wales. To the south, Liverpool is connected to Widnes and Warrington via the A562 and across the River Mersey to Runcorn, via the Silver Jubilee and Mersey Gateway bridges.

Railway

Liverpool is served by two separate rail networks. The local rail network is managed and run by Merseyrail and provides links throughout Merseyside and beyond (see Local travel below), while the national network, which is managed by Network Rail, provides Liverpool with connections to major towns and cities across England. The city's primary main line station is Lime Street station, which is the terminus for several lines into the city, with numerous destinations including London (in 2 hours 8 minutes with Pendolino trains), Birmingham, Newcastle upon Tyne, Manchester, Preston, Leeds, Scarborough, Sheffield, Nottingham and Norwich. In the south of the city, Liverpool South Parkway provides a connection to the city's airport.

Port
The Port of Liverpool is one of Britain's largest ports, providing passenger ferry services across the Irish Sea to Belfast, Dublin and the Isle of Man. Services are provided by several companies, including the Isle of Man Steam Packet Company, P&O Ferries and Stena Line. In 2007, a new cruise terminal was opened in Liverpool, located alongside the Pier Head in the city centre.
November 2016 saw the official opening of Liverpool2, an extension to the port that allows post-Panamax vessels to dock in Liverpool.

Leeds and Liverpool Canal runs into Liverpool city centre via Liverpool Canal Link at Pier Head since 2009.

Liverpool Cruise Terminal in the city centre provides long-distance passenger cruises, Fred. Olsen Cruise Lines MS Black Watch and Cruise & Maritime Voyages MS Magellan using the terminal to depart to Iceland, France, Spain and Norway.

Airport

Liverpool John Lennon Airport, which is located in the south of the city, provides Liverpool with direct air connections across the United Kingdom and Europe. In 2008, the airport handled over 5.3 million passengers and today offers services to 68 destinations, including Berlin, Rome, Milan, Paris, Barcelona and Zürich. The airport is primarily served by low-cost airlines, notably Ryanair and Easyjet, although it does provide additional charter services in the summer.

Local travel

Trains

Liverpool's local rail network is one of the busiest and most extensive in the country. The network consists of three lines: the Northern Line, which runs to Southport, Ormskirk, Kirkby and Hunts Cross; the Wirral Line, which runs through the Mersey Railway Tunnel and has branches to New Brighton, West Kirby, Chester and Ellesmere Port; and the City Line, which begins at Lime Street, providing links to St Helens, Wigan, Preston, Warrington and Manchester.

The network is predominantly electric. Electrification of the City Line was completed in 2015. The two lines operated by Merseyrail are the busiest British urban commuter networks outside London, covering  of track, with an average of 110,000 passenger journeys per weekday. Services are operated by the Merseyrail franchise and managed by Merseytravel. Local services on the City Line are operated by Northern rather than Merseyrail, although the line itself remains part of the Merseyrail network.

Buses

Local bus services within and around Liverpool are managed by Merseytravel and are run by several different companies, including Arriva and Stagecoach. The two principal termini for local buses are Queen Square bus station (located near Lime Street railway station) for services north and east of the city, and Liverpool One bus station (located near the Albert Dock) for services to the south and east. Cross-river services to the Wirral use roadside terminus points in Castle Street and Sir Thomas Street. A night bus service also operates on Saturdays providing services from the city centre across Liverpool and Merseyside.
City Sights and City explorer by Maghull coaches offer a tour bus service.
National Express also operates.

Mersey Ferry
The cross-river ferry service in Liverpool, known as the Mersey Ferry, is managed and operated by Merseytravel, with services operating between the Pier Head in Liverpool and both Woodside in Birkenhead and Seacombe in Wallasey. Services operate at intervals ranging from 20 minutes, at peak times, to every hour during the middle of the day and at weekends. Despite remaining an important transport link between the city and the Wirral Peninsula, the Mersey Ferry has become an increasingly popular tourist attraction within the city, with daytime River Explorer Cruises providing passengers with an historical overview of the River Mersey and surrounding areas.

Cycling
In May 2014, the CityBike hire scheme was launched in the city. The scheme provides access to over 1,000 bikes stationed at over 140 docking stations across the city.
National Cycle Route 56, National Cycle Route 62 and National Cycle Route 810 run through Liverpool.

Culture
As with other large cities, Liverpool is an important cultural centre within the United Kingdom, incorporating music, performing arts, museums and art galleries, literature and nightlife amongst others. In 2008, the cultural heritage of the city was celebrated with the city holding the title of European Capital of Culture, during which time a wide range of cultural celebrations took place in the city, including Go Superlambananas! and La Princesse. Liverpool has also held Europe's largest music and poetry event, the Welsh national Eisteddfod, three times, despite being in England, in 1884, 1900, and 1929.

Music

Liverpool is internationally known for music and is recognised by Guinness World Records as the "World Capital City of Pop". Musicians from the city have produced 56 No. 1 singles, more than any other city in the world. Both the most successful male band and girl group in global music history have contained Liverpudlian members. Liverpool is most famous as the birthplace of the Beatles and during the 1960s was at the forefront of the Beat Music movement, which would eventually lead to the British Invasion. Many notable musicians of the time originated in the city including Billy J. Kramer, Cilla Black, Gerry and the Pacemakers and The Searchers. The influence of musicians from Liverpool, coupled with other cultural exploits of the time, such as the Liverpool poets, prompted American poet Allen Ginsberg to proclaim that the city was "the centre of consciousness of the human universe". Other musicians from Liverpool include Billy Fury, A Flock of Seagulls, Echo & the Bunnymen, Frankie Goes to Hollywood, Frankie Vaughan, Anathema, Ladytron, The Zutons, Cast, Atomic Kitten and Rebecca Ferguson. The La's 1990 hit single "There She Goes" was described by Rolling Stone as a "founding piece of Britpop's foundation."

The city is also home to the oldest surviving professional symphony orchestra in the UK, the Royal Liverpool Philharmonic Orchestra, which is based in the Philharmonic Hall. The chief conductor of the orchestra is Vasily Petrenko. Sir Edward Elgar dedicated his Pomp and Circumstance March No. 1 to the Liverpool Orchestral Society, and the piece had its first performance in the city in 1901. Among Liverpool's curiosities, the Austrian émigré Fritz Spiegl is notable. He not only became a world expert on the etymology of Scouse, but composed the music to Z-cars and the Radio 4 UK Theme.

The Mathew Street Festival is an annual street festival that is one of the most important musical events in Liverpool's calendar. It is Europe's largest free music event and takes place every August. Other well established festivals in the city include Africa Oyé and Brazilica which are the UK's largest free African and Brazilian music festivals respectively. The dance music festival Creamfields was established by the Liverpool-based Cream clubbing brand which started life as a weekly event at Nation nightclub. There are numerous music venues located across the city, however, the Liverpool Arena is by far the largest. Opened in 2008, the 11,000-seat arena hosted the MTV Europe Music Awards the same year, and since then has played host to world-renowned acts such as Andrea Bocelli, Beyoncé, Elton John, Kanye West, Kasabian, The Killers, Lady Gaga, Oasis, Pink, Rihanna, and UB40.

On 7 October 2022, the BBC and the European Broadcasting Union (EBU) announced that Liverpool would host the Eurovision Song Contest 2023 on behalf of the previous year's winning country Ukraine, who was unable to meet the demands of hosting the event due to security concerns caused by the 2022 Russian invasion of Ukraine. The contest will be held at the Liverpool Arena and will consist of two semi-finals on 9 and 11 May, and a final on 13 May 2023. This will be the first time that the contest will take place in the city, and will also be the record-extending ninth time that the UK has hosted the contest, having last done so in Birmingham in 1998.

Visual arts

Liverpool has more galleries and national museums than any other city in the United Kingdom apart from London. National Museums Liverpool is the only English national collection based wholly outside London. The Tate Liverpool gallery houses the modern art collection of the Tate in the North of England and was, until the opening of Tate Modern, the largest exhibition space dedicated to modern art in the United Kingdom. The FACT centre hosts touring multimedia exhibitions, while the Walker Art Gallery houses one of the most impressive permanent collections of Pre-Raphaelite art in the world. Sudley House contains another major collection of pre-20th-century art. Liverpool University's Victoria Building was re-opened as a public art gallery and museum to display the University's artwork and historical collections which include the largest display of art by Audubon outside the US. A number of artists have also come from the city, including painter George Stubbs who was born in Liverpool in 1724.

The Liverpool Biennial festival of arts runs from mid-September to late November and comprises three main sections; the International, The Independents and New Contemporaries although fringe events are timed to coincide. It was during the 2004 festival that Yoko Ono's work "My mother is beautiful" caused widespread public protest when photographs of a naked woman's pubic area were exhibited on the main shopping street.

Literature
Felicia Hemans (née Browne) was born in Dale Street, Liverpool, in 1793, although she later moved to Flintshire, in Wales. Felicia was born in Liverpool, a granddaughter of the Venetian consul in that city. Her father's business soon brought the family to Denbighshire in North Wales, where she spent her youth. They made their home near Abergele and St. Asaph (Flintshire), and it is clear that she came to regard herself as Welsh by adoption, later referring to Wales as "Land of my childhood, my home and my dead". Her first poems, dedicated to the Prince of Wales, were published in Liverpool in 1808, when she was only fourteen, arousing the interest of Percy Bysshe Shelley, who briefly corresponded with her.

It stood on the North Shore before the docks were built and was a place where farewells could be waved to departing voyagers.

A number of notable authors have visited Liverpool, including Daniel Defoe, Washington Irving, Thomas De Quincey, Herman Melville, Nathaniel Hawthorne, Charles Dickens, Gerard Manley Hopkins and Hugh Walpole. Daniel Defoe, after visiting the city, described it, as "one of the wonders of Britain in his 'Tour through England and Wales'".

Herman Melville's novel Redburn deals with the first seagoing voyage of 19 years old Wellingborough Redburn between New York and Liverpool in 1839. Largely autobiographical, the middle sections of the book are set in Liverpool and describe the young merchantman's wanderings, and his reflections. Hawthorne was stationed in Liverpool as United States consul between 1853 and 1856. Charles Dickens visited the city on numerous occasions to give public readings. Hopkins served as priest at St Francis Xavier Church, Langdale St., Liverpool, between 1879 and 81. Although he is not known to have ever visited Liverpool, Jung famously had a vivid dream of the city which he analysed in one of his works.

Of all the poets who are connected with Liverpool, perhaps the greatest is Constantine P. Cavafy, a twentieth-century Greek cultural icon, although he was born in Alexandria. From a wealthy family, his father had business interests in Egypt, London and Liverpool. After his father's death, Cavafy's mother brought him in 1872 at the age of nine to Liverpool, where he spent part of his childhood being educated. He lived first in Balmoral Road, then when the family firm crashed, he lived in poorer circumstances in Huskisson Street. After his father died in 1870, Cavafy and his family settled for a while in Liverpool. In 1876, his family faced financial problems due to the Long Depression of 1873, so, by 1877, they had to move back to Alexandria.

Her Benny, a novel telling the tragic story of Liverpool street urchins in the 1870s, written by Methodist preacher Silas K. Hocking, was a best-seller and the first book to sell a million copies in the author's lifetime. The prolific writer of adventure novels, Harold Edward Bindloss (1866–1945), was born in Liverpool.

The writer, docker and political activist George Garrett was born in Secombe, on the Wirral Peninsula in 1896 and was brought up in Liverpool's South end, around Park Road, the son of a fierce Liverpool–Irish Catholic mother and a staunch 'Orange' stevedore father. In the 1920s and 1930s, his organisation within the Seamen's Vigilance Committees, unemployed demonstrations, and hunger marches from Liverpool became part of a wider cultural force. He spoke at reconciliation meetings in sectarian Liverpool, and helped found the Unity Theatre in the 1930s as part of the Popular Front against the rise of fascism, particularly its echoes in the Spanish Civil War. Garrett died in 1966.

The novelist and playwright James Hanley (1897–1985) was born in Kirkdale, Liverpool, in 1897 (not Dublin, nor 1901 as he generally implied) to a working-class family. Hanley grew up close to the docks and much of his early writing is about seamen. The Furys (1935) is first in a sequence of five loosely autobiographical novels about working-class life in Liverpool. James Hanley's brother, novelist Gerald Hanley (1916–92) was also born in Liverpool (not County Cork, Ireland, as he claimed). While he published a number of novels he also wrote radio plays for the BBC as well as some film scripts, most notably The Blue Max (1966). He was also one of several scriptwriters for a life of Gandhi (1964). Novelist Beryl Bainbridge (1932–2010) was born in Liverpool and raised in nearby Formby. She was primarily known for her works of psychological fiction, often set among the English working classes. Bainbridge won the Whitbread Awards prize for best novel in 1977 and 1996 and was nominated five times for the Booker Prize. The Times newspaper named Bainbridge among their list of "The 50 greatest British writers since 1945".

J. G. Farrell was born in Liverpool in 1935 but left at the outbreak of war in 1939. A novelist of Irish descent, Farrell gained prominence for his historical fiction, most notably his Empire Trilogy (Troubles, The Siege of Krishnapur and The Singapore Grip), dealing with the political and human consequences of British colonial rule. However, his career ended when he drowned in Ireland in 1979 at the age of 44.

Helen Forrester was the pen name of June Bhatia (née Huband) (1919–2011), who was known for her books about her early childhood in Liverpool during the Great Depression, including Twopence to Cross the Mersey (1974), as well as several works of fiction. During the late 1960s the city became well known for the Liverpool poets, who include Roger McGough and the late Adrian Henri. An anthology of poems, The Mersey Sound, written by Henri, McGough and Brian Patten, has sold well since it was first being published in 1967.

Liverpool has produced several noted writers of horror fiction, often set on Merseyside – Ramsey Campbell, Clive Barker and Peter Atkins among them. A collection of Liverpudlian horror fiction, Spook City was edited by a Liverpool expatriate, Angus Mackenzie, and introduced by Doug Bradley, also from Liverpool. Bradley is famed for portraying Barker's creation Pinhead in the Hellraiser series of films.

Performing arts

Liverpool also has a long history of performing arts, reflected in several annual theatre festivals such as the Liverpool Shakespeare Festival, which takes place inside Liverpool Cathedral and in the adjacent historic St James' Gardens every summer; the Everyword Festival of new theatre writing, the only one of its kind in the country; Physical Fest, an international festival of physical theatre; the annual festivals organised by Liverpool John Moores University's drama department and the Liverpool Institute for Performing Arts; and other festivals by the large number of theatres in the city, such as the Empire, Epstein, Everyman, Playhouse, Royal Court, and Unity theatres.

Notable actors and actresses from Liverpool include Arthur Askey, Tom Baker, Kim Cattrall, Jodie Comer, Stephen Graham, Rex Harrison, Jason Isaacs, Tina Malone, the McGann brothers (Joe, Mark, Paul, and Stephen), David Morrissey, Elizabeth Morton, Peter Serafinowicz, Elisabeth Sladen, Alison Steadman, and Rita Tushingham. Actors and actresses from elsewhere in the world have strong ties to the city, such as Canadian actor Mike Myers (whose parents were both from Liverpool) and American actress Halle Berry (whose mother was from Liverpool).

Nightlife
Liverpool has a thriving and varied nightlife, with the majority of the city's late-night bars, pubs, nightclubs, live music venues and comedy clubs being located in a number of distinct districts. A 2011 TripAdvisor poll voted Liverpool as having the best nightlife of any UK city, ahead of Manchester, Leeds and even London. Concert Square, St. Peter's Square and the adjoining Seel, Duke and Hardman Streets are home to some of Liverpool's largest and most famed nightclubs including Alma de Cuba, Blue Angel, Korova, The Krazyhouse (Now Electrik Warehouse), The Magnet, Nation (home of the Cream brand, and Medication, the UK's largest and longest-running weekly student event), Popworld as well as numerous other smaller establishments and chain bars. Another popular nightlife destination in the city centre is Mathew Street and the Gay Quarter, located close to the city's commercial district, this area is famed for The Cavern Club alongside numerous gay bars including Garlands and G-Bar. The Albert Dock and Lark Lane in Aigburth also contain an abundance of bars and late-night venues.

Education

In Liverpool primary and secondary education is available in various forms supported by the state including secular, Church of England, Jewish, and Roman Catholic. Islamic education is available at primary level, but there is no secondary provision.
One of Liverpool's important early schools was The Liverpool Blue Coat School; founded in 1708 as a charitable school.

The Liverpool Blue Coat School is the top-performing school in the city with 100% 5 or more A*-C grades at GCSE resulting in the 30th best GCSE results in the country and an average point score per student of 1087.4 in A/AS levels. Other notable schools include Liverpool College founded in 1840 Merchant Taylors' School founded in 1620. Another of Liverpool's notable senior schools is St. Edward's College situated in the West Derby area of the city. Historic grammar schools, such as the Liverpool Institute High School and Liverpool Collegiate School—both closed in the 1980s—are still remembered as centres of academic excellence. Bellerive Catholic College is the city's top-performing non-selective school, based upon GCSE results in 2007.

Liverpool has three universities: the University of Liverpool, Liverpool John Moores University and Liverpool Hope University. Edge Hill University, founded as a teacher-training college in the Edge Hill district of Liverpool, is now located in Ormskirk in South-West Lancashire. Liverpool is also home to the Liverpool Institute for Performing Arts (LIPA).

The University of Liverpool was established in 1881 as University College Liverpool. In 1884, it became part of the federal Victoria University. Following a Royal Charter and Act of Parliament in 1903, it became an independent university, the University of Liverpool, with the right to confer its own degrees. It was the first university to offer degrees in biochemistry, architecture, civic design, veterinary science, oceanography and social science.

Liverpool Hope University, which was formed through the merger of three colleges, the earliest of which was founded in 1844, gained university status in 2005. It is the only ecumenical university in Europe. It is situated on both sides of Taggart Avenue in Childwall and has a second campus in the city centre (the Cornerstone).

The Liverpool School of Tropical Medicine, founded to address some of the problems created by trade, continues today as a post-graduate school affiliated with the University of Liverpool and houses an anti-venom repository.

Liverpool John Moores University was previously a polytechnic, and gained status in 1992. It is named in honour of Sir John Moores, one of the founders of the Littlewoods football pools and retail group, who was a major benefactor. The institution was previously owned and run by Liverpool City Council. It traces it lineage to the Liverpool Mechanics Institute, opened in 1823, making it by this measure England's third-oldest university.

The city has one further education college, Liverpool Community College in the city centre. Liverpool City Council operates Burton Manor, a residential adult education college in nearby Burton, on the Wirral Peninsula.

There are two Jewish schools in Liverpool, both belonging to the King David Foundation. King David School, Liverpool is the High School and the King David Primary School. There is also a King David Kindergarten, featured in the community centre of Harold House. These schools are all run by the King David Foundation located in Harold House in Childwall; conveniently next door to the Childwall Synagogue.

Sport

Football

Liverpool is one of the most successful footballing cities in England, and is home to two top flight Premier League teams. Everton F.C. was founded in 1878 and play at Goodison Park and Liverpool F.C. were founded in 1892 and play at Anfield. Between them, the clubs have won 28 English First Division titles, 12 FA Cup titles, 10 League Cup titles, 6 European Cup titles, 1 FIFA Club World Cup title, 1 European Cup Winners' Cup title, 3 UEFA Cup titles, and 24 FA Charity Shields.

The two clubs contest the Merseyside derby, dubbed the 'friendly derby'. Despite the name the fixture is known for its keen rivalry, having seen more sending-offs in this fixture than any other. Unlike many other derbies it is not rare for families in the city to contain supporters of both clubs. Liverpool F.C. is the English and British club with the most European Cup titles with six, the latest in 2019.

Liverpool has played at Anfield since 1892, when the club was formed to occupy the stadium following Everton's departure due to a dispute with their landlord. Liverpool are still playing there 125 years later, although the ground has been completely rebuilt since the 1970s. The Spion Kop (rebuilt as an all-seater stand in 1994–95) was the most famous part of the ground, gaining cult status across the world due to the songs and celebrations of the many fans who packed onto its terraces. Anfield is classified as a 4 Star UEFA Elite Stadium with capacity for 54,000 spectators in comfort and is a distinctive landmark in an area filled with smaller and older buildings. Liverpool club also has a multimillion-pound youth training facility called The Academy.

After leaving Anfield in 1892, Everton moved to Goodison Park on the opposite side of Stanley Park. The ground was opened on 24 August 1892, by Lord Kinnaird and Frederick Wall of the FA but the first crowds to attend the ground saw a short athletics meeting followed by a selection of music and a fireworks display. Everton's first game there was on 2 September 1892 when they beat Bolton 4–2. It now has the capacity for just under 40,000 spectators all-seated, but the last expansion took place in 1994 when a new goal-end stand gave the stadium an all-seater capacity. The Main Stand dates back to the 1970s, while the other two stands are refurbished pre-Second World War structures.

Everton is currently in the process of relocating, with a stadium move mooted as early as 1996. In 2003, the club were forced to abandon plans for a 55,000-seat stadium at King's Dock due to financial constraints, with further proposed moves to Kirkby (comprising part of Destination Kirkby, moving the stadium just beyond Liverpool's council boundary into Kirkby) and Walton Hall Park similarly scrapped. The latest plan is a move to nearby Bramley-Moore Dock on Liverpool's waterfront, with ground broken on the project in August 2021.

Rugby league
Rugby league is a developing sport in Liverpool, with many community partners assisting the sport's governing body (RFL) to offer opportunities to participate. These include well established professional clubs in the neighbouring towns of St. Helens and Widnes. The city has a thriving student rugby league scene; Liverpool University took part in the first university game in 1968 and the other universities have been regular participants in the BUSA competition.

Today there are a number of non-professional clubs in the city, including Liverpool Buccaneers, who in 2006 won the regional final of the Rugby League Conference and in 2008 were elevated to the Rugby League Conference National division. Two junior clubs, Liverpool Lions (based in Croxteth) and Liverpool Storm (based in Childwall), have been established in 2008. They will be competing in the NWC Junior leagues in 2009. Rugby league has more recently returned to Huyton-with-Roby in the form of the Huyton Bulldogs A.R.L.F.C. Huyton Bulldogs currently compete in the RL Merit League, and their home ground is at the Jubilee Playing Fields, Twig Lane, Huyton.

A number of secondary schools throughout Merseyside are now participating in the inaugural merit league and 2008 is the first year that Merseyside schools have qualified for the RFL's Champion Schools tournament. Primary schools have been competing in tag festivals for a few years and the annual Tag World Cup is one of the major events in the Liverpool schools' competition calendar.

Boxing
Boxing is massively popular in Liverpool. The city has a proud heritage and history in the sport and is home to around 22 amateur boxing clubs, which are responsible for producing many successful boxers, such as Nel Tarleton, Alan Rudkin, John Conteh, Andy Holligan, Liam Smith, Paul Hodkinson, Tony Bellew and Robin Ried. The city also boasts a consistently strong amateur contingent which is highlighted by Liverpool being the most represented city on the GB Boxing team, as well as at the 2012 London Olympics, the most notable Liverpool amateur fighters include; Jimmy Lloyd, George Turpin, Tony Willis, Robin Reid and David Price who have all medalled at the Olympic Games. Boxing events are usually hosted at the Echo Arena and Liverpool Olympia within the city, although the former home of Liverpool boxing was the renowned Liverpool Stadium.

Horse racing
 Aintree is home to the world's most famous steeple-chase, the John Smith's Grand National which takes place annually in early April. The race meeting attracts horse owners/ jockeys from around the world to compete in the demanding  and 30-fence course. There have been many memorable moments of the Grand National, for instance, the 100/1 outsider Foinavon in 1967, the dominant Red Rum and Ginger McCain of the 1970s and Mon Mome (100/1) who won the 2009 meeting. In 2010, the National became the first horse race to be televised in high-definition in the UK.

Golf
The Royal Liverpool Golf Club, situated in the nearby town of Hoylake on the Wirral Peninsula, has hosted The Open Championship on a number of occasions, most recently in 2014. It also hosted the Walker Cup in 1983.

Greyhound racing
Liverpool once contained four greyhound tracks, Seaforth Greyhound Stadium (1933–1965), Breck Park Stadium (1927–1948), Stanley Greyhound Stadium (1927–1961) and
White City Stadium (1932–1973). Breck Park also hosted boxing bouts and both Stanley and Seaforth hosted Motorcycle speedway.

Athletics
Wavertree Sports Park is home to the Liverpool Harriers athletics club, which has produced such athletes as Curtis Robb, Allyn Condon (the only British athlete to compete at both the Summer and Winter Olympics), and Katarina Johnson-Thompson; Great Britain was represented by Johnson-Thompson at the 2012 London Olympics in the women's heptathlon, and she would go on to win the gold medal at the 2019 World Championships, giving Liverpool its first gold medal and breaking the British record in the process.

Gymnastics
In August 2012, Liverpool gymnast Beth Tweddle won an Olympic bronze medal in London 2012 in the uneven bars at her third Olympic Games, thus becoming the most decorated British gymnast in history. Park Road Gymnastics Centre provides training to a high level.

Swimming
Liverpool has produced several swimmers who have represented their nation at major championships such as the Olympic Games. The most notable of which is Steve Parry who claimed a bronze medal at the 2004 Athens Olympics in the 200m butterfly. Others include Herbert Nickel Haresnape, Margaret Kelly, Shellagh Ratcliffe and Austin Rawlinson. There is a purpose-built aquatics centre at Wavertree Sports Park, which opened in 2008. The City of Liverpool Swimming Club has been National Speedo League Champions 8 out of the last 11 years.

Cricket
The city is the hub of the Liverpool and District Cricket Competition, an ECB Premier League. Sefton Park and Liverpool are the league's founder members based in the city with Wavertree, Alder and Old Xaverians clubs having joined the league more recently. Liverpool plays host Lancashire County Cricket Club as an outground most seasons, including six of eight home County Championship games during Lancashire's 2011 title winning campaign whilst Old Trafford was refurbished.

Tennis
Since 2014 Liverpool Cricket Club has played host to the annual Tradition-ICAP Liverpool International tennis tournament, which has seen tennis stars such as Novak Djokovic, David Ferrer, Mardy Fish, Laura Robson and Caroline Wozniacki. Previously this had been held at Calderstones Park, situated in Allerton in the south of the city. Liverpool Tennis Development Programme at Wavertree Tennis Centre is one of the largest in the UK.

Basketball

Professional basketball came to the city in 2007 with the entry of Everton Tigers, now known as Mersey Tigers, into the elite British Basketball League. The club was originally associated with Everton F.C., and was part of the Toxteth Tigers youth development programme, which reached over 1,500 young people every year. The Tigers began to play in Britain's top league for the 2007–08 season, playing at the Greenbank Sports Academy before moving into the newly completed Echo Arena during that season. After the 2009–10 season, Everton F.C. withdrew funding from the Tigers, who then changed their name to Mersey Tigers.

Baseball
Liverpool is one of three cities which still host the traditional sport of British baseball and it hosts the annual England-Wales international match every two years, alternating with Cardiff and Newport. Liverpool Trojans are the oldest existing baseball club in the UK.

Cycling
The 2014 Tour of Britain cycle race began in Liverpool on 7 September, utilising a city centre circuit to complete  of racing. The Tour of Britain took nine stages and finished in London on 14 September.

Other
A 2016 study of UK fitness centres found that, of the top 20 UK urban areas, Liverpool had the highest number of leisure and sports centres per capita, with 4.3 centres per 100,000 of the city population.

Media
The city has one daily newspaper: the Echo, published by Reach plc. The Liverpool Daily Post was also published until 2013. The UK's first online only weekly newspaper called Southport Reporter (Southport and Mersey Reporter), is also one of the many other news outlets that cover the city. The independent media organisation The Post  also covers Liverpool, while Nerve magazine publishes articles and reviews of cultural events.

LOCAL TV Liverpool is a local television station serving Liverpool City Region and surrounding areas. The station is owned and operated by Made Television Ltd and forms part of a group of eight local TV stations. It broadcasts from studios and offices in Liverpool.

The ITV region which covers Liverpool is ITV Granada. In 2006, the Television company opened a new newsroom in the Royal Liver Building. Granada's regional news broadcasts were produced at the Albert Dock News Centre during the 1980s and 1990s. The BBC also opened a new newsroom on Hanover Street in 2006.

ITV's daily magazine programme This Morning was broadcast from studios at Albert Dock until 1996, when production was moved to London. Granada's short-lived shopping channel "Shop!" was also produced in Liverpool until it was cancelled in 2002.

Liverpool is the home of the TV production company Lime Pictures, formerly Mersey Television, which produced the now-defunct soap operas Brookside and Grange Hill. It also produces the soap opera Hollyoaks, which was formerly filmed in Chester and began on Channel 4 in 1995. All three series were/are largely filmed in the Childwall area of Liverpool.

Radio stations include BBC Radio Merseyside, Liverpool Live Radio, Melodic Distraction, In Demand Radio, Capital Liverpool, Radio City and Greatest Hits Radio Liverpool & The North West. The last two are owned by Bauer and located in Radio City Tower which, along with the two cathedrals, dominates the city's skyline.

Liverpool has also featured in films; see List of films set in Liverpool for some of them. In films the city has "doubled" for London, Paris, New York, Chicago, Moscow, Dublin, Venice and Berlin.

Notable people

Quotes about Liverpool

 "Lyrpole, alias Lyverpoole, a pavid towne, hath but a chapel ... The king hath a castelet there, and the Earl of Darbe hath a stone howse there. Irisch merchants cum much thither, as to a good haven ... At Lyrpole is smaul custom payed, that causith marchantes to resorte thither. Good marchandis at Lyrpole, and much Irish yarrn that Manchester men do buy there ..." – John Leland, Itinerary, c. 1536–1539
 "Liverpoole is one of the wonders of Britain ... In a word, there is no town in England, London excepted, that can equal [it] for the fineness of the streets, and the beauty of the buildings." – Daniel Defoe, A tour thro' the Whole Island of Great Britain, 1721–1726
 "[O]ne of the neatest, best towns I have seen in England." – John Wesley. Journal, 1755
 "I have not come here to be insulted by a set of wretches, every brick in whose infernal town is cemented with an African's blood." – George Frederick Cooke (1756–1812), an actor responding to being hissed at when he came onstage drunk during a visit to Liverpool
 "That immense City which stands like another Venice upon the water ... where there are riches overflowing and every thing which can delight a man who wishes to see the prosperity of a great community and a great empire ... This quondam village, now fit to be the proud capital of any empire in the world, has started up like an enchanted palace even in the memory of living men." – Thomas Erskine, 1st Baron Erskine, 1791
 "I have heard of the greatness of Liverpool, but the reality far surpasses my expectation." – Prince Albert, speech, 1846
 "Liverpool ... has become a wonder of the world. It is the New York of Europe, a world city rather than merely British provincial." – Illustrated London News, 15 May 1886
 "The dream represented my situation at the time. I can still see the greyish-yellow raincoats, glistening with the wetness of the rain. Everything was extremely unpleasant, black and opaque – just as I felt then. But I had a vision of unearthly beauty, and that is why I was able to live at all. Liverpool is the “pool of life.” The “liver,” according to an old view, is the seat of life, that which makes to live." – C. G. Jung, Memories, Dreams, Reflections, 1928
 "The centre is imposing, dignified and darkish, like a city in a rather gloomy Victorian novel ... We had now arrived in the heart of the big city, and as usual it was almost a heart of darkness. But it looked like a big city, there was no denying that. Here, emphatically, was the English seaport second only to London. The very weight of stone emphasised that fact. And even if the sun never seems to properly rise over it, I like a big city to proclaim itself a big city at once..." – J. B. Priestley, English Journey, 1934
 "If Liverpool can get into top gear again, there is no limit to the city's potential. The scale and resilience of the buildings and people is amazing – it is a world city, far more so than London and Manchester. It doesn't feel like anywhere else in Lancashire: comparisons always end up overseas – Dublin, or Boston, or Hamburg. The city is tremendous, and so, right up to the First World War, were the abilities of the architects who built over it. The centre is humane and convenient to walk around in, but never loses its scale. And, in spite of the bombings and the carelessness, it is still full of superb buildings. Fifty years ago it must have outdone anything in England." – Ian Nairn, Britain's Changing Towns, 1967

International links

Twin cities
Liverpool is twinned with:

 Surabaya, Indonesia (2017)
 Birmingham, Alabama, United States (2015)
 Cologne, Germany (1952)
 Dublin, Ireland (1997)
 Johor Bahru, Malaysia
 Medan, Indonesia
 Odesa, Odesa Oblast, Ukraine
 Penang, Malaysia
 Rio de Janeiro, Brazil (2003)
 Shanghai, China (1999)

Friendship links
Liverpool has friendship links (without formal constitution) with the following cities:

 Givenchy-lès-la-Bassée, Pas-de-Calais, France
 Halifax, Nova Scotia, Canada
 Havana, La Habana, Cuba
 La Plata, Buenos Aires Province, Argentina
 Memphis, Tennessee, US
 Minamitane, Kagoshima Prefecture, Japan
 Naples, Campania, Italy
 New Orleans, Louisiana, US
 Ponsacco, Tuscany, Italy
 Râmnicu Vâlcea, Vâlcea County, Romania
 Valparaíso, Valparaíso Province, Chile
 Guadalajara, Jalisco, Mexico

Consulates
The first overseas consulate of the United States was opened in Liverpool in 1790, and it remained operational for almost two centuries. Today, a large number of consulates are located in the city serving Chile, Denmark, Estonia, Finland, France, Germany, Hungary, Iceland, Italy, Netherlands, Norway, Romania, Sweden and Thailand. Tunisian & Ivory Coast Consulates are located in the neighbouring Metropolitan Borough of Sefton.

Freedom of the City
The following people and military units have received the Freedom of the City of Liverpool.

Individuals
 List of Freemen of the City of Liverpool.

Military units
 Duke of Lancaster's Regiment: 14 September 2008.
 War Widows Association (Merseyside Branch): 1 December 2014.
 208 (3rd West Lancashire) Battery 103rd (Lancashire Artillery Volunteers) Regiment Royal Artillery: 14 October 2017.
 8th Engineer Brigade, RE: 11 December 2020.

Organisations and groups
 The Pain Relief Foundation: 3 March 2010.
 The Whitechapel Centre: 5 October 2016.
 The Parachute Regiment Association (Liverpool Branch): 24 October 2021.
 The Royal Signals Association (Liverpool Branch): 26 November 2021.

See also

 1911 Liverpool general transport strike
 2008 European Amateur Boxing Championships
 Atlantic history
 Big Dig (Liverpool)
 Healthcare in Liverpool
 History of slavery
 International Garden Festival
 List of films and television shows set in Liverpool
 List of hotels in Liverpool
 Magistrates Courts, Liverpool
 Triangular trade
 Williamson Tunnels
 :Category: Culture in Liverpool
Liver bird

Notes

References

Footnotes

Bibliography

Further reading
 
 Liverpool, Dixon Scott, 1907
 A History of Liverpool, Ramsay Muir, 1907
 Bygone Liverpool, Ramsay Muir, 1913
 Bygone Liverpool, David Clensy, 2008. 
 Liverpool 800, John Belchem, 2006. 
 Beatle Pete, Time Traveller, Mallory Curley, 2005.
 Chinese Liverpudlians, Maria Lin Wong, 1989. 
 Writing Liverpool: Essays and Interviews, edited by Michael Murphy and Rees Jones, 2007. 
 Jenkinson, Jacqueline, Black 1919: Riots, Racism and Resistance in Imperial Britain (Liverpool: Liverpool University Press, 2009)
 May, Roy and Cohen, Robin, ‘The Interaction between Race and Colonialism: A Case Study of the Liverpool Race Riots of 1919', Race and Class XVI.2 (1974), pp. 111–26

External links

 A Summary of the Liverpool City Region – PDF (archived)
 Liverpool Pictorial
 Liverpool City Council
 Official Liverpool European Capital of Culture website (archived)
 Official Liverpool Tourism Site (archived)

 
1207 establishments in England
Cities in North West England
Metropolitan boroughs of Merseyside
Populated coastal places in Merseyside
Populated places established in the 1200s
Port cities and towns of the Irish Sea
Port cities and towns in North West England
Towns in Merseyside
NUTS 3 statistical regions of the United Kingdom
Unparished areas in Merseyside